The 7th Seattle Film Critics Society Awards were announced on January 17, 2023.

The nominations were announced on January 9, 2023, with Everything Everywhere All at Once leading the nominations with fourteen, followed by The Banshees of Inisherin with nine and Top Gun: Maverick with eight.

Everything Everywhere All at Once received the most awards with four wins, including Best Picture and Best Director, followed by The Banshees of Inisherin with three.

The awards were dedicated this year to Sheila Benson (Los Angeles Times) and John Hartl (The Seattle Times), two of the "finest" film critics to live and work in the Pacific Northwest. After her retirement from the Los Angeles Times in 1991, Benson wrote for several print publications and websites, at both the local and national level, while Hartl was a Seattle icon who spent his entire 52-year career writing for The Seattle Times. They will be missed for their "incisive contributions, as well as their warm and wise camaraderie at press screenings and festival events".

This year, a new category—Achievement in Pacific Northwest Filmmaking—was added to specifically honor Pacific Northwest filmmaking. This award is meant to celebrate the many talented filmmakers who call the region home and who produce work there. A nominating committee carefully considered a wide variety of feature films released during 2022 with strong connections to the region and selected five finalists. The winner will be determined by a vote of the full membership and announced alongside the SFCS's other awards on January 17; the nominees were announced via YouTube on December 5, 2022.

Winners and nominees

Winners are listed first and highlighted in bold.

References

External links
 Official website

2022 in American cinema
Seattle
Seattle Film Critics Society Awards